State Route 209 (SR 209) was a  state highway that serves as a connection between downtown and SR 58 to U.S. Route 82 (US 82) and SR 25 in Centreville in central Bibb County.

Route description
SR 209 began at its intersection with SR 58 in the central business district of Centreville. The route continued in a northerly direction past the Bibb County Courthouse prior to turning in a northwesterly direction, along SR 25, en route to its northern terminus at US 82/SR 6/SR 25. The highway followed the following streets: Market Street, Court Square, Valley Street, and (while concurrent with SR 25) Montevallo Road.

History
State Route 209 was decommissioned in August 2015, along with State Route 58, when US 82 was rerouted, and SR 382 was created.

Major intersections

References

External links

209
Transportation in Bibb County, Alabama